The Staffora is a river of the Oltrepò Pavese in the Province of Pavia, north-west Italy and a right-side tributary of the Po. It is probably the river known to the Romans as the Iria.

Course
The river rises in the Ligurian Apennines at the Fontana di S. Giacomo, elevation , near the Passo del Giovà, which lies just to the east of the peak of Monte Chiappo in the commune of Santa Margherita di Staffora. It flows at first through a deep and narrow valley, receiving from the right the waters of the torrents Montagnola and Aronchio before reaching Varzi where the valley begins to widen.  The torrent Crenna enters from the right and the Lella from the left  before the Staffora receives its major affluents: from the right: the torrent Nizza at Ponte Nizza and the torrent Ardivestra at Godiasco and from the left the torrent Semola near Ponte Nizza. The river flows through Salice Terme (administratively a frazione of Godiasco) before entering the Pianura Padana at Rivanazzano Terme. The Staffora then passes through the eastern outskirts of Voghera, the principal town on its course, before entering the Po near Cervesina.

Regime
Although the river flows throughout the year, fed by perennial springs as well as by seasonal rains and melting ice, the regime is torrential: its discharge can vary between

History
The river is usually identified with the Roman Iria, following the derivation of ‘Voghera’, which lies on the left bank of the Staffora, from Vicus Iria. Some, however, have identified the Iria with the Scrivia.

The word ‘Stàffora’, once ‘Stàfula’, comes from the Lombard "Staffel", which first referred to a place on the river's course near Voghera: cascina Stàffela.

References
The initial basis for the article was the corresponding article in the Italian-language Wikipedia.

Further reading
https://web.archive.org/web/20061013171416/http://www.comunitamontanaoltrepo.it/Areapubblica/Aspettigeografici.asp 
http://www.vallestaffora.info/index.php?option=com_content&task=view&id=28&Itemid=28 
https://web.archive.org/web/20060509141537/http://www.cpt-italia.it/territorio2.htm 
http://www.provincia.pv.it/ambiente/acqua/pdf/rinaturaliz_staffora.pdf 

Rivers of Italy
Rivers of Lombardy
Rivers of the Province of Pavia